Childe Madaleno Fortuna Dundão (born 17 May 1998) is an Angolan basketball player who plays for Petro de Luanda of the Angolan Basketball League and the Basketball Africa League (BAL).

Professional career
Dundão started his career with Petro de Luanda in 2016. On 8 January, he re-signed for another season.

Dundão helped Petro reach the 2022 BAL Finals as the team's starting point guard, gathering All-Defensive Team honours in the same season.

National team career
Dundão has played for the Angola national junior teams in the 2016 FIBA Africa Under-18 Championship and the 2017 FIBA Under-19 Basketball World Cup.

References

External links
Childe Dundão at Afrobasket
Childe Dundão at Proballers

1998 births
Atlético Petróleos de Luanda basketball players
Angolan men's basketball players
Point guards
Basketball players from Luanda
Living people